Surf City are a space rock/shoegaze/indie band from Auckland, New Zealand.

History
Surf City was formed in 2004 in Mt Roskill, Auckland. Attention for the band quickly spread overseas, and they were picked up by notable label Morr Music for U.S and German distribution. Music website Stereogum tapped them as a "jangling, uptempo but melancholic form of shoegaze pop". They released a self-titled EP in 2008, a full-length album Kudos on Fire Records in 2010, and another album in 2013 entitled We Knew It Was Not Going to Be Like This. Their final release was the 2015 album, Jekyll Island.

Discography

References

New Zealand indie rock groups
New Zealand space rock musical groups
Shoegazing musical groups
Morr Music artists
Fire Records (UK) artists